The Mélanges de l'École française de Rome is a journal of history and archeology published by the École française de Rome.

History 
First published under the title Mélanges d'archéologie et d'histoire from 1881 to 1970, there are now several series: 
Mélanges de l'École française de Rome : Antiquité (MEFRA)
Mélanges de l'École française de Rome : Moyen Âge (MEFRM) 
Mélanges de l'École française de Rome : Italie et Méditerranée (MEFRIM)

Bibliography 
 "Cent ans de publications", in Archives de France, L'École française de Rome 1875-1975, Paris-Rome, 1975, (pp. 35–68).

External links 
 Les Mélanges de l'École française de Rome on Persée

History journals
Archaeology journals
Publications established in 1881
French-language journals
1881 establishments in Italy